The  14th Democratic Party of Japan leadership election was held on 4 June 2010 after the incumbent party President Yukio Hatoyama resigned after failing to fulfil a promise to the voters regarding the United States Forces Japan's bases in Okinawa Prefecture; his resignation was reportedly an attempt to improve the DPJ's chances in the upcoming House of Councillors election in July 2010. Also incumbent party Secretary-General Ichirō Ozawa resigned on 4 June 2010 due to many recent scandals. Finance Minister Naoto Kan was widely expected to succeed Hatoyama, and a new government was expected to be formed on 7 June 2010. On 3 June 2010 Shinji Tarutoko declared his candidacy to run against Naoto Kan for the leadership. Apart from these two, Transport Minister Seiji Maehara and Foreign Affairs Minister Katsuya Okada were also seen as contenders, but both backed Kan. Kan defeated Tarutoko by a vote of 291–129 with 2 invalid ballots was elected president of DPJ.

Kan was seen as coming from the left of the DPJ and emphasized his independence from Ozawa; he succeeded in getting the backing of right-wingers Maehara, Okada and Yoshito Sengoku. He was sworn in as PM on the same day. A government reshuffle was expected over the weekend.

Presidential election results

 1 invalid vote

References

2010 elections in Japan
Political party leadership elections in Japan
Democratic Party (Japan, 1998) leadership election